Italian Football League (IFL) is the top level American football league in Italy established in 1980. 
The top tier teams final game to determine the league champion is called the Italian Bowl.

History

In the 1970's teams formed and played in Italy. In 1980 the first official American football league in Italy was established and crowned a champion. The Italian league (Series A) in the late 1970's and early 1980's, was one of the first leagues in Europe to sign professional import players and coaches from the USA. The league had good popularity in the early years especially the late 1980's and early 1990's with reported attendance of nearly 30,000 fans for a Series A league final championship game in that time period. American Football in Italy has had ups and downs since that time but has always had a competitive league with different lower levels playing below the Italian Football League (IFL). 

The new IFL was founded in 2008, taking over previous league's significance called (National Football League Italy). The league was born as a result of the escape of several of the best clubs of the old championship organized by the Italian federation, such as Milano Rhinos, Parma Panthers, Bologna Doves and Bolzano Giants. However some of the historic Italian clubs have not joined the new league and continue to participate in different tournaments organized by other federations.  

In the following years a lot of teams moved to the Federazione Italiana di American Football (the federation the IFL belongs to) and most of the biggest teams are now again part of the IFL that is the First Division or in the other two divisions. 

The Bergamo Lions have won the most Italian Bowl league championships winning 12 finals.

On Saturday, July 1, 2023, Italian Bowl XLII will be played at the Glass Bowl Stadium on the campus of The University of Toledo, Toledo, Ohio, USA. This will mark the first Italian Football League Championship held outside of Europe.

IFL teams 

Ancona Dolphins (2008–present) 
Bergamo Lions (2008–10, 2012, 2014–2019) (2023-present)
Bologna Doves (2008–09, 2011–12) (now in III Division)
Bologna Warriors (2009–present)
Bolzano Giants (2008–2020)
Catania Elephants (2008–12) (now in II Division)
Ferrara Aquile (2014–present)
Firenze Guelfi (2016–present)
Lazio Marines (2009–present)
Legnano Frogs (2023–present) 
Martesana Daemons (2012) (now in II Division)
Milano Rhinos (2008–2018, 2020–present)
Milano Seamen (2011–present)
Napoli Briganti (2014–present) 
Palermo Corsari (2008 †) 
Palermo Sharks (2008) (now in II Division)
Parma Panthers (2008–present)
Reggio Emilia Hogs (2009–13) (now in II Division)
Roma Grizzlies (2015–2018) 
Torino Giaguari (2014–present)

† defunct
♦ due to league expansion the Napoli team can play the 2015 IFL season and is not relegated to the second division
‡ Roma Grizzlies won the second division championship and earned the right to play the 2015 IFL season

Italian Bowl
Italian Bowl is the game that awards the scudetto. Until 2014 the championship game was called Italian Super Bowl

MVP Italian Bowl
Until 2014 the championship game was called Superbowl italiano.
 2008 MVP Reggie Greene  (RB, Giants Bolzano)
 2009 MVP Reggie Greene  (RB, Giants Bolzano)
 2010 MVP Greg Hay  (RB, Panthers Parma)
 2011 MVP Tanyon Bissell  (WR, Panthers Parma), MVP Ita Tommaso Monardi  (QB, Panthers Parma), MVP Def Michele Canali  (DL, Panthers Parma)
 2012 MVP Kevin Grayson  (WR, Panthers Parma)
 2013 MVP Alessandro Malpeli Avalli  (RB, Panthers Parma), MVP Usa Ryan Christian  (RB, Panthers Parma), MVP Def Simone Bernardoni  (DL, Panthers Parma)
 2014 MVP Mattia Binda  (RB, Milano Seamen), MVP USA Jonathan Dally  (QB, Milano Seamen), MVP def Andrea Zini  (DB, Milano Seamen).
 2015 MVP Stefano Di Tunisi  (WR, Milano Seamen), MVP USA Jonathan Dally  (QB, Milano Seamen)
 2016 MVP Nick Ricciardulli  (RB, Rhinos Milano)
 2017 MVP Luke Zahradka  (QB.Milano Seamen)
 2018 MVP Stefano Di Tunisi  (WR, Milano Seamen)
 2019 MVP Luke Zahradka  (QB.Milano Seamen)
 2020 No season played because of the COVID-19 pandemic
 2021 MVP Tommaso Finadri  (WR Panthers Parma)
 2022 MVP Lorenzo Dalle Piagge  (DE, Florence Guelfi)

Notable Players & Coaches

 Gill Fenerty, 1986 Bolzano Jets running back, Later played in the CFL and then NFL.
 Tyrone Rush, 1998-2004 Bergamo Lions running back, played in NFL. IFL MVP 1999.
 Brock Olivo, 2003-2004 Lazio Marines running back, played in NFL.
 George Paton (American football executive), 1992 Milano defensive back, Current GM of the Denver Broncos.
 Bradlee Van Pelt, 2009-2010 Bergamo Lions quarterback, Played in NFL.
  Bob Frasco, 1987-1989 Legnano Frogs, 1991 Phoenix San Lazzaro, 1994-95 Bergamo Lions quarterback, Played in NFL. IFL Hall of Fame inductee.
  Reggie Greene, 2000-2011 Bolzano Giants running back, 4 time IFL MVP, all time leading rusher and IFL Hall of Fame inductee.
 Scott Lockwood, 1994-96 Bergamo Lions running back, played in NFL.
 Kris Durham, 2017-2018 Parma Panthers wide receiver, played in NFL.
 Chris Ault, 2016-2017 Milano Rhinos head coach.
 John Rosenberg (American football) 2005-2006 Bergamo Lions head coach.
  Sam Pagano, 1994-96, 2001-2002 Bergamo Lions head coach. 
  Ronald Barber, Quarterback for Condor Grosseto 1989-1990, Pythons Milano 1991, Phoenix San Lazzaro 1992 -1995. From-CAL STATE FULLERTON
  Ricky Bynum, 1983-88 Milano Rhinos running back. 
  John Knight, 1988-1995 Bologna Doves, Ravenna Chiefs linebacker.   Arizona State
  Mike Wyatt, 1990-1994 Ferrara Eagles head coach.

References

External links
American Football International
American Football International Italy
Italian Superbowl history

 

American football in Italy
American football leagues in Europe
2008 establishments in Italy
Sports leagues established in 2008
American expatriate players of American football